Elżbieta Franke-Cymerman (born 10 March 1940) is a Polish fencer. She competed in the women's individual and team foil events at the 1968 and 1972 Summer Olympics.

References

1940 births
Living people
Polish female fencers
Olympic fencers of Poland
Fencers at the 1968 Summer Olympics
Fencers at the 1972 Summer Olympics
People from Sandomierz County
Sportspeople from Świętokrzyskie Voivodeship
Universiade medalists in fencing
Universiade silver medalists for Poland
20th-century Polish women